The 2019 ISSF Junior World Cup is the annual edition of the ISSF Junior World Cup, governed by the International Shooting Sport Federation

Men's results

Rifle events

Individual Results

Team Results

Pistols Events

Individual Results

Team Results

Shotgun Events

Individual Results

Team Results

Women's Results

Rifle events

Individual Results

Team Results

Pistols Events

Individual Results

Team Results

Shotgun Events

Individual Results

Team Results

Mixed Team Results 

(BMM - Bronze Medal Match)

Medal table

References 

ISSF Junior World Cup
ISSF shooting competitions